is one of the techniques adopted later by the Kodokan into their Shinmeisho No Waza (newly accepted techniques) list. The technique is executed by first dodging Uke's Kouchi gari, thereby forcing them off balance, and subsequently throwing Uke to the left or right by twisting their hands. Therefore, it is categorized as a hand technique (Te-waza).

Similar Techniques, Variants, and Aliases 

English alias
Small inner reap reversal

Included Systems 
Judo

See also 
Judo Techniques by type.
Judo Lists by rank.

External links
Animation
klnjudo.com
Kodokan Description

Judo technique